In evolution, a maladaptation is a trait that is (or has become) more harmful than helpful, in contrast with an adaptation, which is more helpful than harmful. All organisms, from bacteria to humans, display maladaptive and adaptive traits. In animals (including humans), adaptive behaviors contrast with maladaptive ones. Like adaptation, maladaptation may be viewed as occurring over geological time, or within the lifetime of one individual or a group.

It can also signify an adaptation that, whilst reasonable at the time, has become less and less suitable and more of a problem or hindrance in its own right, as time goes on. This is because it is possible for an adaptation to be poorly selected or become more of a dysfunction than a positive adaptation, over time.

Note that the concept of maladaptation, as initially discussed in a late 19th-century context, is based on a flawed view of evolutionary theory. It was believed that an inherent tendency for an organism's adaptations to degenerate would translate into maladaptations and soon become crippling if not "weeded out" (see also eugenics). In reality, the advantages conferred by any one adaptation are rarely decisive for survival on its own, but rather balanced against other synergistic and antagonistic adaptations, which consequently cannot change without affecting others.

In other words, it is usually impossible to gain an advantageous adaptation without incurring "maladaptations". Consider a seemingly trivial example: it is apparently extremely hard for an animal to evolve the ability to breathe well in air and in water. Better adapting to one means being less able to do the other.

Examples
 During periods of climate change—such as cooling or the currently experienced global warming—species that were well adapted in the original climate may be maladapted to the new climate and die out, if they are prevented from shifting their range due to geological barriers.  
 Resistance to antibiotics is usually an adaptation or maladaption issue from the point of view of infective agents: the initial disease agents are well adapted to the physiological conditions of their host and can proliferate. When antibiotics are employed, those organisms that have no or little resistance against them are at a disadvantage. However, being able to detoxify antibiotics comes at a price: the mechanisms conferring antibiotic resistance (e.g. beta-lactamase) are rarely useful for any other purpose. Hence, energy that would otherwise be available to grow and reproduce is diverted for antibiotics detoxification. To an infective organism, it is thus a trade-off between being able to outgrow resistant strains in the absence of antibiotics, and being able to detoxify antibiotics if these are encountered. An evolutionarily stable strategy is thus not possible, if antibiotics are not used indiscriminately.

 Dodos were able to cope with the climate conditions on Mauritius. There, during parts of the year semi-arid conditions predominate, and plants produce relatively little biomass that dodos would have used as food (such as fruits), whereas in the wet season there is an overabundance of food. Dodos apparently adapted to this by building up fat deposits when food was plentiful, and adjusting their breeding cycle to climate conditions. However, this resulted in a lack of anti-predator adaptation, and they were hunted easily by humans and other introduced predators. The breeding cycle, which originally ensured that as little effort as possible was invested in reproduction, made them vulnerable to the introduced pigs and monkeys, as there was little possibility for a dodo whose egg had been destroyed to re-nest before the year's reproductive season was over.
 A term used known as neuroplasticity is defined as "the brain's ability to reorganize itself by forming new neural connections throughout life". Neuroplasticity is seen as an adaptation that helps humans to adapt to new stimuli, especially through motor functions in musically inclined people, as well as several other hand-eye coordination activities. An example of maladaptation in neuroplasticity within the evolution of the brain is phantom pain in individuals who have lost limbs. While the brain is exceptionally good at responding to stimuli and reorganizing itself in a new way to then later respond even better and faster in the future, it is sometimes unable to cope with the loss of a limb, even though the neurological connections are lost. One journal "Adaptation and Maladaptation" found that in some cases, the changes that had previously aided the human brain to best suit an environment could also become maladaptive. In this case, with the loss of a limb, the brain is perceiving pain, though there are no nerves or signals from the now missing limb to give the brain that perception.

See also
 Black robin
 Ecological traps
 Evolutionary mismatch
 Maladaptive coping

References

External links
 

All articles with unsourced statements
Evolutionary biology
Selection